The Man Who Shook the Hand of Vicente Fernandez is a 2012 American Western film starring Ernest Borgnine. It was the final film in which Borgnine starred. The film was written and directed by Elia Petridis.

Plot
A retired radio disc jockey/actor (Ernest Borgnine) is forced to enter a nursing home, where he unexpectedly finds the respect and acclaim that eluded him throughout his long career.

Cast
Ernest Borgnine as Rex Page
Barry Corbin as Walker
Carla Ortiz as Solena
Arturo Del Puerto as Alejandro
Tony Plana as Dr. Dominguez
Dale Dickey as Denise
June Squibb as Irma
Audrey P. Scott as Clementine
Reynaldo Pacheco as Miguel
Ashley Holliday as Rita
Nathalie Kelley as Pretty Annie
Alex Fernandez as Bandito / Paramedic
Dylan Kenin as Cowboy
Robert Morse as Burt

Reception
, the film holds a 40% approval rating on Rotten Tomatoes, based on five reviews with an average rating of 5.5/10.

References

External links
 
 

2012 films
2010s English-language films
2012 Western (genre) films
American Western (genre) films
2010s American films